Roger Lawrence Schwietz, OMI (born July 3, 1940) is an American prelate of the Catholic Church. Schwietz served as archbishop of the Archdiocese of Anchorage in Alaska from 2001 to 2016.  He previously served as bishop of the Diocese of Duluth in Minnesota from 1989 to 2000.

Biography

Early life
Schwietz was born on July 3, 1940, in Saint Paul, Minnesota, the son of a Polish-American tavern owner. Roger Schwietz was baptized on July 21, 1940.  He attended a Christian Brothers’ high school in Saint Paul.  On August 15, 1961, Schwietz made his first profession as a member of the Oblates of Mary Immaculate and entered their seminary.

Schwietz attended college at the University of Ottawa in Ottawa, Ontario, earning first a Bachelor of Psychology degree and then a Master of Psychology degree.  He later earned a Master of Counseling Psychology degree from Loyola University Chicago.

Priesthood 
On December 20, 1967, Schwietz was ordained to the priesthood in Rome by Archbishop John Robert Roach for the Oblates of Mary Immaculate After his ordination, Schwietz spent the next seven years working with seminarians in his order. He served a pastoral assignment at a parish in Fond du Lac, Wisconsin in the Diocese of Milwaukee. He earned his Licentiate of Sacred Theology from the Pontifical Gregorian University in 1968.

In 1975, Schwietz was appointed associate pastor of St. Thomas Aquinas Parish in International Falls, Minnesota.  He was named director of the College Seminary program for his religious institute in 1978 at Creighton University in Omaha, Nebraska.  In 1984, Schwietz became pastor of Holy Family Parish in Duluth, Minnesota.

Bishop of Duluth

On December 12, 1989, Pope John Paul II appointed Schwietz as the seventh bishop of the Diocese of Duluth. He was consecrated on February 2, 1990 by Archbishop John Roach, with Bishops Robert Brom and Michael Pfeifer serving as co-consecrators, at the Cathedral of Our Lady of the Rosary in Duluth, Michigan.Schwietz served as episcopal moderator for Teens Encounter Christ movement, having held this position since 1991. Schwietz was awarded an Honorary Doctor of Humanities degree from Lewis University in 1998. 

In a 2002 affidavit, Schwietz said that, as bishop of Duluth, he had approved a small settlement of under $100,000 to a former seminarian who claimed in the mid-1990's that he had been sexually abused by Bishop Brom, Cardinal Joseph Bernardin and several priests.  As part of the settlement, shared by the Diocese of Winona, the seminarian retracted all his charges.

Coadjutor Archbishop and Archbishop of Anchorage
On January 18, 2000, John Paul II named Schwietz as coadjutor archbishop of the Archdiocese of Anchorage.  He was installed on March 24, 2000. On March 3, 2001, with the resignation of Archbishop Francis Hurley, Schwietz automatically became archbishop.

On October 2, 2006, Guzman Carriquiry, undersecretary of the Pontifical Council for the Laity in Rome, met with Schwietz , who presented Teens Encounter Christ to the Curial dicastery. Schwietz also served as episcopal liaison to Region I of the National Association of Catholic Chaplains.

Within the United States Conference of Catholic Bishops (USCCB), Schwietz served as a consultant to the Liturgy Committee (1991–1994), member (1992–2004) and chairman (elected 1998) of the Vocation Committee, and member of the Committee on the Laity (1995–1998) and chair of its Subcommittee on Youth (1993–1998).

Schwietz also sat on the Catholic Relief Services' board of directors (1997–2003) and the NCCB Administrative Board (1994–1997, 1998–2002). In 2002, he became regional representative on the board for the American College in Leuven, Belgium.

On January 16, 2008. the Vatican appointed Schwietz as the apostolic administrator of the Diocese of Juneau in Alaska while continuing his position as archbishop.  He ran the diocese until January 19, 2009, when Bishop Edward Burns was consecrated there.  Schwietz was named apostolic administrator again on September 20, 2013, this time for the Diocese of Fairbanks in Alaska.  When Bishop Chad Zielinski was consecrated there on December 15, 2014, Schwietz's duties ended.

Retirement and legacy 
In July 2015, when Schwietz reached the mandatory retirement age of 75, he submitted his letter of resignation to the pope. Pope Francis accepted Schwietz's resignation as archbishop of Anchorage on October 4, 2016.  He was succeeded by Bishop Paul D. Etienne, formerly bishop of the Diocese of Cheyenne in Wyoming.

Schwietz currently serves as pastor of St. Andrew's Parish in Eagle River, Alaska. On April 28, 2017, Schwietz was brought to Providence Alaska Medical Center with complaints of chest pain, later diagnosed as a heart attack. In late November 2017, he underwent heart valve replacement surgery at the Mayo Clinic in Rochester, Minnesota. Schwietz also owns a home in Fort Myers, Florida.

 

 Catholic Church hierarchy
 Catholic Church in the United States
 Historical list of the Catholic bishops of the United States
 List of Catholic bishops of the United States
 Lists of patriarchs, archbishops, and bishops

References

External links

Roman Catholic Archdiocese of Anchorage Official Site
Official site of the Holy See

Episcopal succession

1940 births
Living people
Clergy from Saint Paul, Minnesota
Roman Catholic bishops of Duluth
Roman Catholic archbishops of Anchorage
20th-century Roman Catholic bishops in the United States
21st-century Roman Catholic archbishops in the United States
University of Ottawa alumni
Creighton University faculty
American people of Polish descent
Bishops appointed by Pope John Paul II
Missionary Oblates of Mary Immaculate